The 1998 Paegas Czech Open was a men's tennis tournament played on Clay in Prague, Czech Republic that was part of the International Series of the 1998 ATP Tour. It was the twelfth edition of the tournament and was held from 27 April – 3 May 1998.

Seeds
Champion seeds are indicated in bold text while text in italics indicates the round in which those seeds were eliminated.

Draw

Finals

References

Doubles
Prague Open (1987–1999)
1998 in Czech tennis